G1, G01, G.I, G-1, or G One may refer to:

Science and technology
 G1 phase, in the cellular cycle
 G1 regulatory sequence for the insulin gene
 ATC code G01 Gynecological antiinfectives and antiseptics, a subgroup of the Anatomical Therapeutic Chemical Classification System
 Alkali metal, Group 1 of the periodic table
 G1, an informal group of fossil bird eggs from the Gobi desert that were later named Gobioolithus minor

Astronomy 
 Globular cluster Mayall II
 YGKOW G1, a giant elliptical galaxy that lensed the Twin Quasar
 G1 star, a subclass of G-class stars
 G1, a cloud that passed by Sagittarius A* around 2001-2002
 g1, temporary designation of minor planet , a New Horizons flyby candidate

Computing
 Garbage-first collector, of the Oracle HotSpot Java virtual machine
 G1, in ISO 2022 character sets, one of 4 groups of characters that may be swapped into the encoding space via control codes

Cameras
 Contax G1, a Rangefinder camera made by Contax
 DSC-G1, a 2007 Sony Cyber-shot G series camera model
 PowerShot G1, a Canon camera
 Panasonic Lumix DMC-G1, a digital camera made by Panasonic

Military
 Ordnance QF 25 pounder (South African Army designation: G1)
 G-1 (submarine), a class of early-20th century submarines constructed by the Lake Torpedo Boat Company of Bridgeport, Connecticut and purchased by the US Navy
 Char G1, a French tank
 G1, the designation used by the West German and Turkish armies for the FN FAL rifle
 G.I, a German designation for several World War I heavy bombers:
 AEG G.I
 Albatros G.I, a German aircraft whose development was the Albatros G.II 1916 aircraft
 Friedrichshafen G.I
 Gotha G.I
 Hansa-Brandenburg G.I, a 1916 bomber aircraft
 Fokker G.I, a 1937 Dutch heavy twin-engined fighter plane
 G-1 military flight jacket, a type of flight jacket
 Kampfgeschwader 55 (historic Geschwaderkennung code G1), with the Luftwaffe in World War II

Sports
 G1 Climax, an annual professional wrestling singles tournament held by New Japan Pro Wrestling
 Group One, the highest level races in horseracing

Transportation
 G1 Aviation G1, French ultralight aircraft
 G1 Beijing–Harbin Expressway, in China
 Alfa Romeo G1, a 1921 Italian car
 Gorkha Airlines (IATA airline designator)
 One of the G-series Toronto subway cars

Other uses
 G1 (website), a Brazilian news portal owned by Grupo Globo
 G1 Group, a Scottish hospitality and leisure operator
 G1 licence, the first tier in the graduated licensing programme for Ontario's new drivers
 G.One (character), an android super hero
 Gangwon No.1 Broadcasting, a Seoul Broadcasting System television channel in Gangwon Province
 T-Mobile G1, the first publicly available Android smartphone
 Transformers: Generation 1, a toy line which ran from 1984 to 1992
 The Transformers (TV series), an animated television series meant to promote the toy line (popularly referred to as Generation 1)

See also
 1G (disambiguation)
 G (disambiguation)